The 1984 Rothmans Grand Prix was the first edition of the tournament under the Grand Prix name and had replaced the Professional Players Tournament name, which was used first in 1982. Total prize money was £225,000, then the largest in the history of snooker. Unlike the Professional Players Tournament, the BBC televised the event, which was held at the Hexagon Theatre in Reading, England. The venue had previously hosted the World Team Classic since 1981, an event formerly also televised by the BBC. The last-16 televised stages took place between 20 and 28 October 1984.

The last-16 matches were played from 20 to 23 October. Dean Reynolds beat Silvino Francisco 5–1, although television replays twice showed him committing fouls that went unnoticed by the referee.

Tony Knowles was the defending champion, however he lost 2–5 to Neal Foulds in the quarter-finals. Foulds met Dennis Taylor in the semi-finals, losing 3–9, having lost all seven frames in the afternoon session. In the other half of the draw, Cliff Thorburn beat Doug Mountjoy 5–3, while Steve Davis beat Dean Reynolds 5–0. Thorburn beat Davis 9–7 in the semi-finals.

Dennis Taylor won his first major tournament after 13 years as a professional by defeating Cliff Thorburn 10–2 in the final, emotionally dedicating the victory to his mother, who had died shortly before the tournament was held. He won the first prize of £45,000.

Main draw

Final

Qualifying
Qualifying took place in Bristol earlier in October 1985. The leading 32 players started at the last 64 stage and needed to win two matches to reach the televised stage.

References

World Open (snooker)
Grand Prix
Grand Prix
Grand Prix